Your Blues is the sixth studio album by Destroyer, released on March 8, 2004 by Merge Records, Trifekta Records, Scratch Records, Talitres Records, and Acuarela Discos.

It is a notable departure from the full-band format of Destroyer's previous few albums, largely featuring MIDI-simulated orchestration as its backing music.

The album was reissued in 2014 by Merge Records.

Critical reception

Your Blues received positive reviews from contemporary music critics. At Metacritic, which assigns a normalized rating out of 100 to reviews from mainstream critics, the album received an average score of 79, based on 14 reviews, which indicates "generally favorable reviews".

Matt LeMay of Pitchfork Media gave the album a very favorable review stating, "Like Bejar's 2002 release This Night, Your Blues constitutes a fundamental challenge to deeply ingrained conventions of sincerity and emotional honesty. The record's conceptual brilliance lies largely in Bejar's ability to craft deeply moving passages out of ostensibly artificial and contrived elements, subtly suggesting that all music, if not all human expression, is in effect some sort of artifice. Bejar's critical engagement with codified aesthetic techniques certainly renders Your Blues a less immediately "accessible" record, and can at first come off as kitschy or detached. But the album's unique and defiant expression makes this the most holistically accomplished album Bejar has released to date."

Track listing

Personnel

Destroyer
Dan Bejar - vocals, acoustic guitar, Roland XV-3080, Kurzweil K2600, percussion, production
John Collins - Roland XV-3080, Kurzweil K2600, production, recording
David Carswell - Roland XV-3080, Kurzweil K2600, production, recording

Additional personnel
Jamie Sitar - mastering at Suite Sound Labs, Vancouver
Sydney Vermont - drawing
Marya Spenton - layout

References and notes

External links 
Streaming version of the track "It's Gonna Take an Airplane"
Streaming version of the track "The Music Lovers"

2004 albums
Destroyer (band) albums
Merge Records albums
Albums produced by John Collins (Canadian musician)
Albums produced by David Carswell